John Kapelos (born March 8, 1956) is a Canadian actor from London, Ontario. He is best known for his portrayals of janitor Carl Reed in The Breakfast Club and Detective Donald Schanke in Forever Knight.

An alumnus of The Second City, Chicago, John Kapelos's theatrical work spans eight years from Second City's Touring Company (1978–1982) to six revues as a member of the famed Resident Company (1982–1986), and finally Second City's critically acclaimed return to off-Broadway in Orwell That Ends Well at the former Village Gate in New York City.

Career
His movie highlights include 1999's The Deep End of the Ocean, which received praise from both The New York Times and Roger Ebert from The Chicago Sun Times. His appearance in three John Hughes films, Sixteen Candles, The Breakfast Club, and Weird Science, earned him fame in the 1980s as a character actor.

Other film works include Schepisi's Roxanne, with Steve Martin and Daryl Hannah, and Garry Marshall's Nothing in Common, opposite Tom Hanks, and Touchstone’s Stick It show his improvisational and comedic timing skills. Whereas roles in The Boost, with James Woods, and Internal Affairs with Richard Gere, present his adaptability for dramatic roles.

Kapelos has also worked on television in shows such as Miami Vice as a corrupt public defender, Desperate Housewives, Queer as Folk, The X-Files, Seinfeld, Home Improvement, Dead Like Me, ER, and Boston Legal. He also played a security guard in a 2010 episode of the television series Nikita, filmed at the University of Toronto.

Kapelos also guest teaches at the AIA Studios focusing on improv/acting workshops; produced a four-part series on YouTube featuring monologues by NPR-contributor Michael Raysses called Greek to Me, and manages an independent record label called Carpuzi Records, which has produced sound recordings featuring him and some of the Second City alumni, such as Dan Castellaneta.

Selected filmography

Film

Television

Internet
 It's All Greek to Me (2007)

References

External links
  via web.archive.org
 
 Syd Arthur and the Knights of Joy

1956 births
20th-century Canadian male actors
21st-century Canadian male actors
Canadian expatriate male actors in the United States
Canadian male film actors
Canadian male television actors
Canadian people of Greek descent
Living people
Male actors from London, Ontario